Joe Bonnie was a well-known Irish drummer. He tutored Larry Mullen Jr. of U2 in the drums in 1971 until his daughter Monica took over the lessons.

References

Irish drummers
Male drummers
Living people
Year of birth missing (living people)
Place of birth missing (living people)
20th-century Irish musicians